Aleš is a Slavic male name. The name is used today in the Czech Republic, Slovakia, and Slovenia.

Notable people with the name Aleš
Aleš Čeh (born 1968), Slovenian footballer
Aleš Řebíček (born 1967), Czech politician
Aleš Šmon (born 1982), Slovenian footballer playing as a midfielder
Aleš Šteger (born 1973), Slovenian poet and editor
Aleš Bárta (born 1960), Czech organist
Aleš Besta (born 1983), Czech football player
Aleš Chvalovský (born 1979), Czech goalkeeper
Aleš Debeljak (born 1961), Slovenian cultural critic, poet, and essayist
Aleš Dryml, Jr. (born 1979), Czech speedway rider
Aleš Gorza (born 1980), Slovenian alpine skier
Aleš Hemský (born 1983), Czech professional ice hockey forward
Aleš Hlad, Slovenian supermotard racer who lives near Ljubljana, Slovenia
Aleš Hrdlička (1869–1943), Czech anthropologist who lived in the US after 1881
Aleš Kačičnik (born 1973), Slovenian football defender
Aleš Klégr (born 1951), Czech linguist
Aleš Kokot (born 1979), Slovenian football player
Aleš Kotalík (born 1978), professional ice hockey right winger
Aleš Križan (born 1971), retired Slovenian football defender
Aleš Mejač (born 1983), Slovenian football midfielder
Aleš Pajovič (born 1979), Slovenian handball player
Aleš Pařez (born 1981), Czech professional ice hockey player
Aleš Pipan (born 1959), the coach of Zlatorog Lasko and of the Slovenian national basketball team
Aleš Puš (born 1979), Slovenian football defender
Aleš Razym (born 1986), Czech cross-country skier from Plzeň
Aleš Ušeničnik (1868–1952), Slovene Roman Catholic priest, philosopher, sociologist and theologian
Aleš Urbánek (born 1980), Czech footballer
Aleš Valenta (born 1973), Czech freestyle skier who participates in aerials
Aleš Vodseďálek (born 1985), Czech Nordic combined skier from Jilemnice
Ales Jindra (born 1973), coach of Liga I champions CFR Cluj
Ales Pisa (born 1977), professional ice hockey defenceman
Ales Vesely (born 1935), Czech sculptor
Josef Aleš-Lyžec (1862–1927), Czech teacher and sportsman
Mikoláš Aleš (1852–1913), Czech painter

See also
Ales (disambiguation)

Czech masculine given names
Slovak masculine given names
Slovene masculine given names